The English mezzo-soprano Carolyn Watkinson (born 19 March 1949) is a singer of baroque music. Her voice is alternately characterized as mezzo-soprano and contralto.

Watkinson was born in Preston and studied at the Royal Manchester College of Music and in The Hague. In 1978 she sang Rameau's Phèdre (Hippolyte et Aricie) at the English Bach Festival at London's Royal Opera House, Covent Garden. In 1979 she appeared as Monteverdi's Nero (L'incoronazione di Poppea) with De Nederlandse Opera in Amsterdam. Also in 1979 she was featured as the contralto soloist in Christopher Hogwood's landmark recording of Handel's Messiah, with the Academy of Ancient Music.

In 1981 Watkinson made her La Scala debut in the title role of Ariodante and sang Rossini's Rosina (Il barbiere di Siviglia) in Stuttgart. She appeared as Gluck's Orfeo (Orfeo ed Euridice) with the Glyndebourne Touring Opera in 1982, and made her formal debut at Glyndebourne as Cherubino (Mozart's Le Nozze di Figaro) in 1984.

1987 Watkinson toured Australia. She was a soloist in Bach's St. John Passion at Gloucester Cathedral in a performance shown on BBC TV on Good Friday in 1989. In 1990, she appeared as Dido in Purcell's Dido and Aeneas at the Salerno Cathedral and sang Nero at the Innsbruck Festival of Early Music.

Recordings
Baroque Opera Recital: Carolyn Watkinson with Jan de Vriend and Amsterdam Bach Soloists. Arias by Purcell, Handel and Gluck. EtCetera Records ETC 1064
Recital at Wigmore Hall, Bizet, Brahms, Berg, Dvorak and Ives: Carolyn Watkinson with Tan Crone. Arias by Bizet, Brahms, Berg, Dvorak and Ives. EtCetera Records ETC 1007
Bach: Weihnachtsoratorium BWV 248 with Barbara Schlick, Kurt Equiluz, Michel Brodard. Ensemble De Lausanne, dir M Corboz.  Warner Classics, Catalog 686217  
Agostino Steffani: Duetti da camera with John Elwes, Paul Eswood and Daniella Mazzucato.  Alan Cutis and Wouter Wouter Möller.  Archiv, Catalog: 437083-2
Handel: Aci, Galatea e Polifemo with Emma Kirkby and David Thomas.  London Baroque, dir Charles Medlam.  Harmonia Mundi France, Catalog: HMC901253.54 
Handel: Rinaldo Performers:  Jeanette Scovotti, Ileana Cotrubas, Carolyn Watkinson, Paul Esswood and others.  La Grande Ecurie et la Chambre du Roy, dir. Jean-Claude Malgoire. Sony, Catalog: 7576412    
Handel: Serse Performers:  Paul Esswood, Carolyn Watkinson, Barbara Hendricks and others. La Grande Ecurie et la Chambre du Roy, dir. Jean-Claude Malgoire.  Sony, Catalog: 752724 
Collectors Edition - Handel: Oratorios Performers:  Emma Kirkby, Carolyn Watkinson, Judith Nelson, Paul Elliott, David Thomas and others.  Christopher Hogwood, Academy of Ancient Music, Christ Church Cathedral Choir, Oxford New College Choir. Decca, Catalog: 000529602   
Handel: Messiah Performers:  Emma Kirkby, Paul Elliott, Carolyn Watkinson, David Thomas and others.  Christopher Hogwood, Academy of Ancient Music, Christ Church Cathedral Choir. L'Oiseau Lyre, Catalog: 430488    
Handel: Alexander's Feast Performers:  Ashley Stafford, Carolyn Watkinson, Donna Brown, Nigel Robson and others.  John Eliot Gardiner, English Baroque Soloists, Monteverdi Choir. Philips, Catalog: 000852702   
Handel: Solomon Performers:  Carolyn Watkinson, Anthony Rolfe Johnson, Nancy Argenta, Barbara Hendricks and others.  John Eliot Gardiner, English Baroque Soloists, Monteverdi Choir. Philips, Catalog: 000667002
Bach: Cantatas Bwv 206, 215 Performers:  Carolyn Watkinson, Edith Mathis, Peter Schreier, Siegfried Lorenz and others.  Berlin Soloists, Berlin Chamber Orchestra, dir Peter Schreier.  Berlin Classics, Catalog: 2422
Bach: Zerreisset Bwv 205, Vereinigte Zwieracht Bwv 207 Performers:  Carolyn Watkinson, Edith Mathis, Peter Schreier, Siegfried Lorenz and others.  Berlin Soloists, Berlin Chamber Orchestra, dir Peter Schreier.  Berlin Classics, Catalog: 2392
Bach: Mass in B Minor Highlights Performers:  Carolyn Watkinson, Edith Mathis, Peter Schreier, Siegfried Lorenz and others.  Berlin Soloists, Berlin Chamber Orchestra, dir Peter Schreier.  Berlin Classics, Catalog: 4910   
Bach: Alto Arias  Performers:  Helen Watts, Carolyn Watkinson, Hildegard Laurich, Julia Hamari and others.  Helmuth Rilling, Stuttgart Bach Collegium. Hänssler Classic, Catalog: 98243  
Bach: Magnificat Performers:  Paul Elliott, Carolyn Watkinson, Emma Kirkby, David Thomas and others.  Simon Preston, Christopher Hogwood, Christ Church Cathedral Choir, Academy of Ancient Music. L'oiseau Lyre, Catalog: 443199    
Vivaldi: Gloria, Motets, Cantatas Performers:  Emma Kirkby, Carolyn Watkinson, Catherine Bott and others.  Philip Pickett, Christopher Hogwood, Simon Preston, New London Consort, Academy of Ancient Music, Christ Church Cathedral Choir.  L'oiseau Lyre, Catalog: 455727   
Purcell: Dido And Aeneas Performers:  George Mosley, Carolyn Watkinson.  John Eliot Gardiner, Monteverdi Choir, English Baroque Soloists. Philips, Catalog: 432114
Monteverdi: Lamento D'arianna, Combattimento  Performers:  Nigel Rogers, Patrizia Kwella, David Thomas, Carolyn Watkinson.  Reinhard Goebel, Musica Antiqua Cologne 
Haydn: Masses Performers:  Emma Kirkby, Carolyn Watkinson, Judith Nelson, Shirley Minty, Rogers Covey-Crump and others.  Simon Preston, Academy of Ancient Music, Christ Church Cathedral Choir.  L'oiseau Lyre, Catalog: 455712  
Haydn: Arianna, English Canzonettas with Glen Wilson.  Virgin Classics Veritas, Catalog: 91215   
Mozart: Requiem Performers:  Emma Kirkby, Anthony Rolfe Johnson, David Thomas, Carolyn Watkinson.  Christopher Hogwood, Academy of Ancient Music, Westminster Cathedral Boys Choir, Academy of Ancient Music Chorus. L'oiseau Lyre, Catalog: 411712  
Mozart: Requiem, Exultate Jubilate  Performers:  Judith Blegen, Carolyn Watkinson, Siegfried Jerusalem, Siegmund Nimsgern and others.  Pinchas Zukerman, Helmuth Rilling, Mostly Mozart Festival Orchestra, Gächinger Kantorei Stuttgart, Stuttgart Bach Collegium.  Sony Classical Essential Classics, Catalog: 89849     
Prokofiev: Alexander Nevsky, Scythian Suite  with Kurt Masur, Leipzig Gewandhaus Orchestra, Latvian State Choir.  Apex, Catalog: 7487472   
Wagner: La Chevauchee Des Walkyries Performers:  Margaretha Hintermeier, Anita Soldh, Silvia Herman, Carolyn Watkinson and others.  Conductor:  Bernard Haitink, Mariss Jansons, Klaus Tennstedt, Otto Klemperer.  Emi Classics, Catalog: 558096
Schmidt: Buch Mit Sieben Siegeln Performers:  Carolyn Watkinson, Peter Schreier, Kurt Rydl, Thomas Moser and others.  Lothar Zagrosek, Austrian Radio Symphony Orchestra, Vienna State Opera Concert Choir.  Orfeo, Catalog: 143862

References
Bach Cantatas biography, accessed 27 January 2010

New York Times review (December 23, 1988), accessed 27 January 2010

1949 births
Living people
20th-century English women singers
20th-century English singers
Musicians from Preston, Lancashire
English opera singers
Operatic mezzo-sopranos
Alumni of the Royal Manchester College of Music
21st-century English women singers
21st-century English singers